Advocate S. K. Bagga is an Indian politician and is member of the Sixth Legislative Assembly of Delhi. He is a member of the Aam Aadmi Party and represents Krishna Nagar (Assembly constituency) of Delhi.

Early life and education
S. K. Bagga is the son of S.L.Bagga. He was reported to be 61 years of age in February 2015. Bagga is a lawyer and a social worker. He is a M. COM (post graduate) and became an advocate (LLB) from Meerut University, Uttar Pradesh in 1992.

S. K. Bagga and his family were part of 2011 Indian anti-corruption movement under the leadership of Anna Hazare. He is the president of the Bhagwan Shri Ram Chander Dusshera Dharmik Committee, since 1993. The organization works for education of underprivileged children.

Bagga is a resident of Krishna Nagar, Delhi and working in the area as lawyer and social worker for more than 40 years.

Political career
Bagga contested Krishna Nagar (Assembly constituency) in 2015 Delhi Legislative Assembly elections from the AAP against Kiran Bedi, the chief ministerial candidate of the Bharatiya Janata Party (BJP). He raised the issue of a simplified Value-added tax (VAT) as well as other issues of traders. He got 65,919 votes and defeated his nearest rival Bedi by a margin of 2,277 votes.

Krishna Nagar was held by Dr. Harsh Vardhan of the BJP (since 1993), who vacated the seat when he was elected to the Indian Parliament in the 2014 Indian general elections. It was considered a bastion of the BJP and a "safe" seat for BJP, which banked on Harsh Vardhan's work in the assembly. Bagga's win was considered a "shocking" upset and earned him sobriquets like "man of the match", "giant killer" and "show stealer". The previously little-known Bagga rose to instant fame, after his victory. Bagga said that his victory was due to his work in the area, while Bedi, who does not reside in the area, was an "outsider".

Member of Legislative Assembly (2015 - 2020)
Between 2015 and 2020 he was a Member of the Sixth Legislative Assembly of Delhi representing Krishna Nagar Assembly constituency.

Member of Legislative Assembly (2020 - present)
Since 2020, he is an elected member of the 7th Delhi Assembly representing Krishna Nagar Assembly constituency.

Committee assignments of Delhi Legislative Assembly 
 Member (2022-2023), Committee on Estimates

See also

Sixth Legislative Assembly of Delhi
Delhi Legislative Assembly
Government of India
Politics of India
Aam Aadmi Party

References 

Living people
Delhi MLAs 2015–2020
Delhi MLAs 2020–2025
Year of birth missing (living people)
Aam Aadmi Party MLAs from Delhi